The 1931 New Hampshire Wildcats football team was an American football team that represented the University of New Hampshire as a member of the New England Conference during the 1931 college football season. In its 16th season under head coach William "Butch" Cowell, the team compiled a 7–2 record, and outscored their opponents, 171–84. The team played its home games in Durham, New Hampshire, at Memorial Field.

Schedule

The 1931 game remains the last time that the Brown and New Hampshire football programs have met.

New Hampshire captain Richard Eustis was inducted to the university's athletic hall of fame in 1983. Eustis, who died in 1969 at the age of 62, served as athletic director at nearby Exeter High School, where the school named its football field after him in 1970.

Notes

References

New Hampshire
New Hampshire Wildcats football seasons
New Hampshire Wildcats football